Count On Me is the self-titled debut studio album by Judah Kelly, the winner of the sixth season of The Voice Australia. The album was released through Universal Music Australia on 28 July 2017. The album peaked at number three on the ARIA Albums Chart.

Critical reception

Emily Ritchie of The Australian said the album "contains a mixture of original tunes and covers, with an overwhelmingly Motown and country influence. The instrumental accompaniment is simple and repetitive, but this ensures Kelly’s voice is highlighted". Ritchie complemented "If I Go" but criticised the covers for "offer[ing] scant differences from the original tunes".

Commercial performance
Count On Me debuted at number three on the ARIA Albums Chart with sales of 2,455 copies. In its second week, the album fell to number 18 with less than 900 copies sold.

Track listing

Charts

Release history

References

2017 debut albums
Universal Music Australia albums